Federale may refer to:

Sports
Fédérale 1, the highest level of French amateur rugby union
Fédérale 2, the second highest level of French amateur rugby union
Fédérale 3, the third highest level of French amateur rugby union
Trofeo Federale, a defunct association football cup in San Marino

Other uses
Federale (band), a rock band from Portland, Oregon
Federales, a slang Spanish term for the Mexican Federal Police
Federales, a colloquial Spanish term for the Federalist Party (Argentina)

See also
Federal (disambiguation)